Manjirō (written: 満次郎 or 万次郎) is a Japanese masculine given name, and may refer to:

, one of the first Japanese people to visit the United States
, Japanese diplomat

See also
 4841 Manjiro, a minor planet named for Nakahama Manjirō

Japanese masculine given names